This article lists the results and fixtures for Bulgaria women's national football team.

the Bulgaria women's national football team is the representative of Bulgaria in international women's association football, It is governed by the Bulgarian Football Union and it competes as a member of the Union of European Football Associations.

The national team's first appearance was in the late 1980s when they entered the 1989 European Competition for Women's Football qualifying, they were drawn in Group 4 alongside France, Czechoslovakia, Belgium and Spain. the Lioness played their first game against Spain women's national football team in Sofia, Bulgaria. the match ended with the teams sharing points.
in the UEFA Women's Euro 1995 qualifying Bulgaria got its first win against the Lithuanian team with Efrossina Kovatscheva Scoring the winning goal. on the other side in the 2015 FIFA Women's World Cup qualification the lioness of Bulgaria suffered a 14-nil loss against France which is the team's largest loss to date.

As of 13 October 2022, Bulgaria is ranked 92nd at the FIFA Women's World Rankings which is their Lowest ranking to date. with its highest FIFA ranking being 33rd in the 2008 December ranking update.

Record per opponent
Key

The following table shows Bulgaria' all-time official international record per opponent:

Results
Legend

1987

1988

1989

1990

1991

1992

1993

1994

1995

1996

1997

1998

2000

2001

2002

2003

2004

2006

2007

2008

2009

2010

2011

2012

2013

2014

2016

2017

2019

2020

2021

2022

See also
 Bulgaria national football team results
 Football in Bulgaria

References

External links
 Bulgaria results on The Roon Ba
 Bulgaria results on XScores
 Bulgaria results on flashscore

2000s in Bulgarian sport
2010s in Bulgarian sport
2020s in Bulgarian sport
Women's national association football team results
results